War's End is a journalistic comic about the Bosnian War written by Joe Sacco. It contains two stories; the first, Christmas with Karadzic, about tracking down and meeting the Bosnian Serb leader Radovan Karadžić, and the second, Soba, about contemporary artist from Sarajevo, Nebojsa Seric - Shoba, who was at the time student at Art Academy Sarajevo and member of local cult bend but he was drafted into army of Bosnia and Herzegovina because of the Siege of Sarajevo. Shoba currently lives and works in New York City.

Notes

References 
 Sacco, Joe (2005). War's End, Drawn & Quarterly. .

Comics by Joe Sacco
Drawn & Quarterly titles
Bosnian War in comics
Cultural depictions of Radovan Karadžić
Non-fiction graphic novels
Siege of Sarajevo in comics